Col des Etroits (el. 1152 m.) is a high mountain pass in the Jura Mountains in the canton of Vaud in Switzerland.

It connects Yverdon and Fleurier.

See also
 List of highest paved roads in Europe
 List of mountain passes
 List of the highest Swiss passes

References

Etroits
Etroits
Mountain passes of the canton of Vaud